John Anthony Lennon (born 1950 in Greensboro, North Carolina) is an American composer of contemporary classical music based in Georgia.

Biography

Early life and education
John Anthony Lennon was born in Greensboro, North Carolina and raised in Mill Valley, California. He earned a B.A. degree in liberal arts from the University of San Francisco, first majoring in English and minoring in philosophy, later adding music courses. He received M.M. and D.M.A. degrees in music composition from the University of Michigan, where he studied composition with Leslie Bassett and William Bolcom.

Academic career
Lennon is Professor Emeritus of Music at Emory University in Atlanta. He formerly taught at the University of Tennessee (starting in 1977), and taught as a guest composer at Northwestern University in the spring of 1998.

Composer
Lennon is known particularly for his works for classical guitar (many of which were written for the American guitarist David Starobin), including Another's Fandango (1981), Gigolo (1996), and the guitar concerto Zingari (1991), and for several contributions to the classical saxophone repertoire, including "Distances Within Me" (1980) for James Forger, "Symphonic Rhapsody" for Donald Sinta, "Spiral Mirrors" (2009) for the Creviston Fader Duo, "Elysian Bridges" (2011) for the Capitol Quartet, and several other chamber pieces.

Lennon's music is published by C. F. Peters, E. C. Schirmer, Dorn Publications, Michael Lorimer Editions, Northeastern Publications, Galaxy/Columbia University Press, and Oxford University Press. His music has been recorded by CRI, Bridge Records, Contemporary Record Society, Society of Composers/Capstone, and Open Loop, and (as a performer) with the University of Michigan recording series.

Awards
In 1981 Lennon was the recipient of a Guggenheim Fellowship. In 1994 he won a Kennedy Center Friedheim Award, tying for third place. Additionally, Lennon has also won a Rome Prize and been a resident of the MacDowell Colony.

Lennon lives in San Rafael, California.

References

External links

John Anthony Lennon official site
John Anthony Lennon faculty page from Emory University
John Anthony Lennon page
John Anthony Lennon page

Listening
John Anthony Lennon audio files

1950 births
20th-century classical composers
21st-century classical composers
American male classical composers
American classical composers
Emory University faculty
People from Mill Valley, California
Musicians from Greensboro, North Carolina
Musicians from Atlanta
Northwestern University faculty
University of San Francisco alumni
University of Michigan School of Music, Theatre & Dance alumni
University of Tennessee faculty
Living people
21st-century American composers
20th-century American composers
20th-century American male musicians
21st-century American male musicians